FTA may refer to:

Arts and media
 The Faery Tale Adventure, a computer game
 Festival TransAmériques, an annual dance and theater festival in Montreal, Quebec, Canada
 Free The Army tour, the F.T.A. Tour or F.T.A. Show, an American anti-Vietnam War road show for G.I.s, who knew it stood for "Fuck The Army"
 F.T.A., a 1972 documentary about the road show

 Free-to-air, free satellite/TV channels
 FTA receiver, for receiving Free-to-Air Broadcasts

Business and commerce 
 Aruban Workers' Federation
 Food, Tobacco, Agricultural, and Allied Workers, an American trade union
 Free trade area
 free trade agreement
 List of bilateral free trade agreements
 List of multilateral free trade agreements
 Freight Transport Association, a British trade association

Mathematics
 Functional-theoretic algebra
 Fundamental theorem of algebra
 Fundamental theorem of arithmetic

Transportation and vehicles
 Futuna Airport, in Vanuatu
 Frontier Flying Service, an American airline
 Federal Transit Administration, part of the United States Department of Transportation
 FTA, a Brazilian research rocket made by Fogtrein

Other uses
 Face-threatening act, damaging someone's self esteem
 Failure to appear, non-appearance when summoned to a court etc. 
 Fault tree analysis, system analysis methodology 
 FTA-ABS, A diagnostic test for syphilis
 Future-oriented technology analysis, a collective term from futures studies

See also

 
 FTV (disambiguation)
 FT (disambiguation)